Multiple Sclerosis Australia, better known as MS Australia, is a national non-profit organization centered on research and advocacy for people living with Multiple Sclerosis. MS Australia became a registered Australian charity in 1975. There are over 25,000 people living with MS in Australia and MS Australia serves as the peak body for all Australians living with or otherwise affected by MS.

The organization describes its approach as being to support "Australia’s strengths within the context of the global MS research effort, build the Australian MS research network and tackle a number of broad research goals." These research goals cover:
 ascertaining how to better diagnose and treat MS, including symptom management and the promotion of rehabilitation
 predicting and preventing MS
 developing strategies to promote cell repair and regeneration

MS Australia encourages a national collaborative effort into MS research. The organization seeks to empower researchers to make discoveries not possible when working alone by inviting individual research teams to apply for support while also supporting major platform' projects. There are numerous instances of MS Australia providing research grants to individual researchers or research teams.

David Hurley, Governor-General of Australia, is the current patron of MS Australia.

Founding 
MS Australia was first established as the Australian MS Society in 1956, with the first general meeting held in February 1957. Nine years earlier, American Sylvia Lawry founded the USA’s National Multiple Sclerosis Society in New York in 1947, co-founding the Multiple Sclerosis International Federation the same year. Soon after followed the establishment of the Multiple Sclerosis Society of Canada in 1948 and the Multiple Sclerosis Society of Great Britain in 1953. The Australian MS Society was therefore the fourth society globally to be established for multiple sclerosis support and advocacy.

Activities

Research 
MS research seeks to address the treatment and prevention of multiple sclerosis and the management of its many symptoms, as well as trying to find a cure. Research into MS encompasses immunology, neurobiology, genetics, and epidemiology, and extends across clinical and allied health disciplines.

In 2004, MS Australia established a subsidiary research branch called MS Research Australia. In June 2020, MS Research Australia was integrated into MS Australia as a fully integrated organization under one CEO and Board.

MS Australia states that the organization's medium to long term strategy focuses on funding research to better understand the biological basis of MS to prevent the disease from being triggered and causing further damage. Simultaneously, this research investigates how existing damage can be repaired to reverse disability.

MS Australia’s short-term strategy focuses on clinical research to measure the benefits of seeking alternative ways to manage MS symptoms. The Australian MS Longitudinal Study (AMSLS) measures the physical, social and economic impact of MS on Australians for advocacy and service development purposes.

MS Australia currently approaches these strategies through several branches:
 MS Australia Gene Bank and ANZgene Consortium.
 MS Research Australia Brain Bank.
 MS Research Australia Clinical Trials Network.
 Australian MS Longitudinal Study (AMSLS).
 Proteomics Collaboration.
 PrevANZ – Vitamin D MS prevention trial.

Research Achievements 
MS Australia claims to have achieved the following through its funding and research efforts:
 26 new research methods.
 7 new clinical blood tests.
 2 new clinical assessment tools.
 18 grants contributed to biobanks.
 5 new mouse models.
 5 new biomarkers in development.
 Creation of key registries through seven separate funding grants.
 Supported research contributing to 5 patents.
 Discovery of a blood test developed by Macquarie University researchers to distinguish between relapsing and progressive forms of MS.
 Increased expressions of interest and confirmed donation pledges to the MS Research Australia Brain bank.
 Successful completion of an important milestone agreement between MS Research Australia, MS Queensland and QIMR to work collaboratively on a phase 1 clinical trial for the Epstein Barr Virus for a potential new therapy for progressive MS.
 Selected as one of four high-impact charities to receive The Sohn Hearts and Minds funding.
 Collaboration with the Macquarie Group Foundation to fund clinical research.
 Support of the Ausimmune study.
 Produced the 2011 Economic Impact of MS in the Australia report, which provides vital data in support of funding applications to leverage further targeted funds for MS research.

Advocacy 
MS Australia describes their advocacy role for the MS community within Australia as comprising three levels:
 Individual. Local-level focus on helping and supporting individual people living with or affected by MS, which may include informal or structured advocacy.
 Systemic. Focused on promoting and actively lobbying for systemic changes to legislation, government and service provider policies, and community attitudes to improve the general situation of people living with MS around Australia.
 Collaborative. This level of advocacy recognizes there exist common issues experienced by many people living with disability or disease, and focuses on supporting and cooperating with other representative bodies nationally and internationally.

Role in the National MS Community 
MS Australia works with state MS bodies, connecting MS community members (including those living with the disease, family, friends, and carers) with support, information, and community. The organization also advocates for these state bodies in communities and with the federal government.

There are four state MS bodies:
 MS Limited: Australian Capital Territory, New South Wales, Victoria, and Tasmania
 MS Queensland: Queensland
 MS Society SA/NT: South Australia and the Northern Territory
 MSWA: Western Australia

MS Australia is also a partner of several Australian support and advocacy groups, such as Rare Voices Australia (RVA), a body which promotes the creation of an Australian National Rare Disease Plan.

Alliances 
MS Australia has close relationships with numerous community representative groups to build awareness of key issues for people with MS. MS Australia is a member of the following alliances:
 Neurological Alliance Australia (NAA)
 Australian Patient Advocacy Alliance (APAA)
 Accessible Product Design Alliance
 Assistive Technology for All Alliance (ATFA)
 Chronic Illness Alliance
 Ending Loneliness Together
 Stem Cells Australia
 International Progressive MS Alliance

Submissions 
MS Australia regularly seeks opportunities to contribute to policy development and government reviews by submitting proposals to the Australian government. These submissions range from those which propose a re-evaluation of cannabinoids by the Therapeutic Goods Administration to facilitate cannabinoid usage for people suffering from MS, to providing information for the National Disability Employment Strategy about key areas affecting people with MS.

Role in the Global MS Community 
MS Australia is involved with numerous international MS organizations. These include:

Multiple Sclerosis International Federation (MSIF) 
The Multiple Sclerosis International Federation comprises 48 MS societies worldwide, including MS Australia. Several MS Australia executive staff hold significant positions on the MSIF Board and fulfil MSIF committee roles.

MS Australia participates annually in World MS Day, which occurs on 30 May and is led by MSIF. Associated activities occur throughout May and early June and are designed to bring the global MS community together to raise awareness of the disease and campaign with all those affected by MS.

International Progressive MS Alliance 
MS Australia is a managing member of the Alliance. Key staff are representatives on a variety of committees including the Executive Committee which is responsible for the oversight, strategic intent, and governance of the global collaborative, the Scientific Steering Committee, and the Fundraising and Communications committee.

The International MS Genetics Consortium

MS Brain Health 
MS Brain Health is an initiative calling for a radical change in the management of MS based on a 2015 report that discusses diagnosis, therapeutic strategies and improving access to treatment in MS. MS Australia keenly endorses this initiative, and several key MS Australia personnel are directly involved with supporting the MS Brain Health global initiative.

References 

Multiple sclerosis organizations
Charities based in Australia